Acetyl-S-ACP:malonate ACP transferase (acetyl-S-ACP:malonate ACP-SH transferase, acetyl-S-acyl-carrier protein:malonate acyl-carrier-protein-transferase, MdcA, MadA, ACP transferase, malonate/acetyl-CoA transferase, malonate:ACP transferase, acetyl-S-acyl carrier protein:malonate acyl carrier protein-SH transferase) is an enzyme with systematic name acetyl-(acyl-carrier-protein):malonate S-(acyl-carrier-protein)transferase. This enzyme catalyses the following chemical reaction

 acetyl-[acyl-carrier protein] + malonate  malonyl-[acyl-carrier protein] + acetate

This is the first step in the catalysis of malonate decarboxylation.

References

External links 
 

EC 2.3.1